Banana Chan is a game designer and writer. Their writing includes work on the indie game, Jiangshi: Blood in the Banquet Hall. She is the owner and co-founder of the tabletop publishing company, Game and a Curry.

Career 
Banana Chan has written for several games, such as the third edition of Betrayal at House on the Hill (2022) and Van Richten's Guide to Ravenloft (2021). Chan and Sen-Foong Lim wrote and designed Jiangshi: Blood in the Banquet Hall, which was published in 2021, and was covered by outlets such as Huffington Post, Forbes, and Dicebreaker.

Awards and Nominations 
In 2015, Chan was given an Honorable Mention in the Golden Cobra Challenge for her live action roleplaying game, The Other Place. The following year in 2016, she won Best Pervasive Game for her live action roleplaying game They’re Onto Me. 

In 2022, Chan and Sen-Foong Lim, along with the Game and a Curry and Wet Ink Games teams were nominated for three ENnies Awards categories for Jiangshi: Blood in the Banquet Hall: Best Setting, Best Production Value and Product of the Year. Chan and Game and a Curry were also nominated for Best Family Game/Product for their game Questlings: RPG in collaboration with Letiman Games and Tim Devine. She was an author for Dune – Adventures in the Imperium: Core Rulebook which won a Gold Ennie for "Best Writing", and Questlings: RPG which won a Silver Ennie for "Best Family Game / Product" and Jiangshi: Blood in the Banquet Hall which won a Silver Ennie for "Best Setting".

Bibliography

Roleplaying Games and Supplements 
Banana Chan is a freelance writer and game designer who has written for several titles in tabletop games.

 Writer and Designer: The Imposters (2018)
 Writer: The North Sea Epilogues (2018)
 Narrative Designer: Sea of Legends (2020)
 Writer: Van Richten’s Guide to Ravenloft (2021)
 Writer: Dune: Adventures in the Imperium (2021)
 Lead Writer and Designer: Jiangshi: Blood in the Banquet Hall (2021)
 Lead Writer and Designer: Questlings: RPG (2021)
 Writer and Designer: Suburban Consumption of the Monstrous (2022)
 Writer and Designer: An Exquisite Crime (2022)
 Writer: Pathfinder 2E Lost Omens: Knights of Lastwall (2022)
 Writer: Pathfinder 2E Dark Archive (2022)
 Writer and Designer: Deimos Academy (TBD)

Kids on Bikes 
 Module Writer: Dads on Mowers (2018)
 Co-author: Grannies on Scooters (2020)
 Module Writer: Doggos on Skateboards (2020)
 Module Writer: Anacondas on Airliners (2020)

Board Games 

 Short Story Writer: Terror Below (2019)
 Lead Haunt Writer, Scooby-Doo: Betrayal at Mystery Mansion (2020)
 Writer: Warp’s Edge (2020)
 Writer: Atheneum; Mystic Library (2020)
 Haunt Writer: Betrayal at House on the Hill 3rd Edition (2022)

References 

Role-playing game designers